Locke Station is an unincorporated community in Panola and Quitman counties, Mississippi, United States. Locke Station is located along U.S. Route 278 and Mississippi Highway 6, east of Marks.

References

Unincorporated communities in Panola County, Mississippi
Unincorporated communities in Quitman County, Mississippi
Unincorporated communities in Mississippi